Three of Swords is the third card of the suit of swords. The suit is present in Italian, Spanish and tarot decks.

Card reading
This card depicts a fundamentally sorrowful experience— tarot readers suggest this may be in the form of a lost relationship, an accidental death, or some other form of not just depression or malaise but deeply emotional sorrow.  When the card appears "reversed" in a spread, this is not usually read as meaning the "opposite" of sorrow, but rather a sorrow that is somehow mitigated by its circumstances or that is not as bad as it could have been.  It is among the most negative cards within the tarot deck.

References

Suit of Swords